Cowles Art School (Cowles School of Art) was established in 1883, in a studio building located at 145 Dartmouth Street in Boston, Massachusetts. It was one of the largest art schools in the city and boasted an enrollment of several hundred until it was closed in 1900.

History 
By the end of the 19th-century, Boston had become an important art center with number of highly respected artists teaching in the city. A rich artistic environment was promoted, at least in part, by the Massachusetts Drawing Act of 1870. The first of its kind in the nation, the legislation added drawing to a list of school subjects that were required to be taught in all Massachusetts public schools: reading, writing, grammar, orthography, geography, arithmetic, United States history, and good behavior. The Drawing Act of 1870 also required towns with populations exceeding 10,000 to make industrial and mechanical drawing instruction available to any interested residents over the age of 15. 

This new legislation caused a spike in the need for qualified artists in Massachusetts. To fill this sudden need for art teachers, Massachusetts Normal Art School (MNA) was established in 1873, and the Cowles Art School was founded ten years later in 1883. Located two blocks behind the Museum of Fine Arts, in the New Studio Building near the Back Bay Station, the school was established by Frank Cowles. He modeled the curriculum off of the Parisian art academies of his time, and borrowed the school's price structure from that of the nearby Art Students League of New York.

Throughout its existence, the art school was well known for its instructors. Frank Cowles placed a heavy emphasis on hiring artists that were also well-versed in mechanical drawing and lecturing, resulting in a faculty of confident artists ready to impart their knowledge to both advanced professionals and brand-new beginner artists. The Cowles Art School merged with the New England Conservatory in 1900, but fine arts instruction there ended only two years later in 1902.

Courses 
The Cowles Art School offered instruction in both men's and women's figure drawing and painting from the flat cast and life, artistic anatomy, perspective, composition, oil painting, watercolors, and both painting and drawing courses in still life and portraiture. Unlike many other art schools of the time, Cowles also offered courses in things like art history, the French language, and literature. According to an article published in 1886 that advocated for more art schools to copy Cowles' educational model, the school had organized itself into six distinct departments: watercolor painting, flowers and still-life, portraiture drawing, drawing from cast, evening classes, and life drawing for men and women.

The school's certification process encouraged students to take breaks and study abroad in Europe, with students finding they had a good reputation amongst schools in Paris. They also welcomed nontraditional students, offering morning, afternoon, and evening classes, summer programs, and Saturday morning lessons. Many exhibition opportunities were open to all students, who regularly won scholarships and awards for their efforts.

Notable instructors

 Dennis Miller Bunker, chief instructor of painting (1885-1889)
 Joseph DeCamp, chief instructor of painting, life drawing (1890-1899)
 Abbott Fuller Graves still life and flowers instructor (1885-1887)
 Childe Hassam (1884-1886)
Robert Vonnoh (1884-1885)
Amy Maria Sacker (1894-1900)
Ernest Lee Major life drawing instructor (1888-1896)
Theodore Wendel (1892-1897)

Notable students 

 Elizabeth Gowdy Baker
 Ethel Isadore Brown 
 Lucia Fairchild Fuller 
 Helen Messinger Murdoch
 John A. Wilson
 Julia Collier Harris
Ethel Reed (1893)
Lila Cabot Perry (1886-1887)
William Cotton
William McGregor Paxton (1893)
Elizabeth Okie Paxton (1893) 
W. Herbert Dunton
George Elmer Browne
Sarah Choate Sears
Henry Brown Fuller
Angel De Cora (1898)
Jo Mora
William Jurian Kaula (1891-1896)
Arthur Merton Hazard

References

Art schools in Massachusetts
Universities and colleges in Boston
Defunct private universities and colleges in Massachusetts
Educational institutions established in 1883
Educational institutions disestablished in 1900
1883 in the arts
1883 establishments in Massachusetts
1900 disestablishments in Massachusetts
Cultural history of Boston